Dietzia timorensis is a bacterium from the genus Dietzia which has been isolated from soil from Kupang from West Timor, Indonesia.

References

Further reading

External links
Type strain of Dietzia timorensis at BacDive -  the Bacterial Diversity Metadatabase	

Mycobacteriales
Bacteria described in 2010